In the European Parliament, the quaestors are elected to oversee administrative and financial matters directly affecting members (MEPs) as well as other duties assigned to them by the Parliament's Rules of Procedure or the Bureau of the European Parliament. Five quaestors are elected among the MEPs for two and a half year-terms, i.e. half a parliamentary term.

Election 
Quaestors are elected after the President and Vice-Presidents of the European Parliament. Rule 18 of the Rules of Procedure dictates that quaestors are elected by the same procedure as the Vice-Presidents, meaning that one or more single ballots are held until all five seats have been filled via either absolute majority (first two ballots) or relative majority (3rd ballot). If the number of candidates does not exceed five, the quaestors are elected by acclamation unless a ballot is requested by members or one or more political groups totaling at least one-fifth of the members.

List of quaestors

9th Parliament (2019–2024)

8th Parliament (2014–2019)

7th Parliament (2009–2014)

6th Parliament (2004–2009)

Footnotes

European Parliament